Tomorrow Is My Turn may refer to:

Tomorrow Is My Turn (film) (Le Passage du Rhin), 1960 film starring Charles Aznavour
"Tomorrow Is My Turn" (song), English version for Nina Simone of "L'Amour, c'est comme un jour" 1962 Charles Aznavour song
Tomorrow Is My Turn (album), a 2015 album by Rhiannon Giddens